Panguan Island is an island in the municipality of Sitangkai, Tawi-Tawi. It is also known as Malamanok, coming from the Sama-Bajau dialect which means eat chicken as locals who travel to Sabah usually use this island as a stop-over to eat roasted chicken prior continuing their journey to Malaysia. It is the last island of the Sulu Archipelago nearest to the Philippine-Malaysian border.

This island is 50 km or 31 miles away from Sabah state. Just like other Philippine border communities, the area lacks access to food, potable water and healthcare.

The island has a newly constructed military barrack, a flagpole, and a small community of Badjao.

History

Panguan Island was used as a hideout by the Abu Sayyaf terror group until it was liberated by the 10th Marines Battalion Landing Team (MBLT-10) of the Philippine Marine Corps after the surrender of eleven high-ranking Abu Sayyaf leaders of Tawi-Tawi in April 2017.

The Philippine flag was hoisted on the island on 29 April 2017 to signify its placement under the control of the Philippine government.

See also

 List of islands of the Philippines
 Philippine Marine Corps
 Abu Sayyaf
 Andulinang Island
 Mardanas Island
 Panampangan Island

References

External links

Panguan Island at OpenStreetMap

Islands of Tawi-Tawi